Grand Ayatollah Mohammad Ali Esmaeelpoor Ghomsheiy (Persian:  محمد علي اسماعيلپور قمشهاي) (born 1940) was an Iranian Twelver Shi'a Marja.

He has studied in seminaries of Qum, Iran under Grand Ayatollah Ruhollah Khomeini and Mohammad-Reza Golpaygani.

Death
Ayatollah Esmailpour died on 11 August 2018.

See also
List of Maraji

Notes

External links
Biography in Persian

Iranian grand ayatollahs
Iranian Islamists
Shia Islamists
1940 births
2018 deaths